Chariobas is a genus of spiders in the family Zodariidae. It was first described in 1893 by Simon. , it contains 5 African species.

Species

Chariobas comprises 5 species:
 C. armatissimus Caporiacco, 1947 — Ethiopia
 C. cylindraceus Simon, 1893 (type) — Ivory Coast, Gabon, Congo, Angola
 C. lineatus Pocock, 1900 — South Africa
 C. mamillatus Strand, 1909 — South Africa
 C. navigator Strand, 1909 — South Africa

References

Zodariidae
Araneomorphae genera
Spiders of Africa